The British film-making partnership of Michael Powell (1905–1990) and Emeric Pressburger (1902–1988)—together often known as The Archers, the name of their production company—made a series of influential films in the 1940s and 1950s. Their collaborations—24 films between 1939 and 1972—were mainly derived from original stories by Pressburger with the script written by both Pressburger and Powell. Powell did most of the directing while Pressburger did most of the work of the producer and also assisted with the editing, especially the way the music was used. Unusually, the pair shared a writer-director-producer credit for most of their films. The best-known of these are The Life and Death of Colonel Blimp (1943), A Canterbury Tale (1944), I Know Where I'm Going! (1945),  A Matter of Life and Death (1946), Black Narcissus (1947), The Red Shoes (1948), and The Tales of Hoffmann (1951).

In 1981, Powell and Pressburger were recognised for their contributions to British cinema with the BAFTA Academy Fellowship Award, the most prestigious award given by the British Academy of Film and Television Arts.

History

Early films
Powell was already an experienced director, having worked his way up from making silent films to the First World War drama The Spy in Black (1939), his first film for Hungarian émigré producer Alexander Korda. Pressburger, who had come from Hungary in 1935, already worked for Korda, and was asked to do some rewrites for the film. This collaboration was the first of 19, most over the next 18 years.

After Powell had made two further films for Korda, he reunited with Pressburger in 1940 for Contraband, the first in a run of Powell and Pressburger films set during the Second World War. The second was 49th Parallel (1941), which won Pressburger an Academy Award for Best Story. Both are Hitchcock-like thrillers made as anti-Nazi propaganda.

Birth of The Archers
The pair adopted a joint writer-producer-director credit for their next film, One of Our Aircraft Is Missing (1942) and made reference to "The Archers" in the credits. In 1943 they incorporated their own production company, Archers Film Productions, and adopted a distinctive archery target logo which began each film. The joint credit "Written, Produced and Directed by Michael Powell and Emeric Pressburger" indicates their joint responsibility for their own work and that they weren't beholden to any studio or other producers.

In a letter to Wendy Hiller in 1942, asking her to appear in Colonel Blimp, Pressburger explicitly set out 'The Archers' Manifesto'. Its five points express the pair's intentions:

 We owe allegiance to nobody except the financial interests which provide our money; and, to them, the sole responsibility of ensuring them a profit, not a loss.
 Every single foot in our films is our own responsibility and nobody else's. We refuse to be guided or coerced by any influence but our own judgement.
 When we start work on a new idea we must be a year ahead, not only of our competitors, but also of the times. A real film, from idea to universal release, takes a year. Or more.
 No artist believes in escapism. And we secretly believe that no audience does. We have proved, at any rate, that they will pay to see the truth, for other reasons than her nakedness.
 At any time, and particularly at the present, the self-respect of all collaborators, from star to prop-man, is sustained, or diminished, by the theme and purpose of the film they are working on.

They began to form a group of regular cast and crew members who worked with them on many films over the next 12 years. Hardly any of these people were ever under contract to The Archers—they were hired film by film—but Powell and Pressburger soon learnt whom they worked well with and who enjoyed working with them. When Raymond Massey was offered the part of the Prosecuting Attorney in A Matter of Life and Death his cabled reply was "For The Archers anytime, this world or the next."

Powell and Pressburger also co-produced a few films by other directors under The Archers' banner: The Silver Fleet (1943), written and directed by Vernon Sewell and Gordon Wellesley, based on a story by Pressburger, and The End of the River (1947), directed by Derek N. Twist, to which both Powell and Pressburger contributed uncredited writing. Both Sewell and Twist had worked with Powell & Pressburger previously on other films and were being given their first chance as directors.

Over the remainder of the war and afterwards, they released a series of acclaimed films:

 The Life and Death of Colonel Blimp (1943)
 The Volunteer (1943) a short propaganda film
 A Canterbury Tale (1944)
 I Know Where I'm Going! (1945)
 A Matter of Life and Death (1946)

The collaboration

Generally, Pressburger created the original story (for all their films from 1940–1946) and wrote the first draft of the script. They then passed the script back and forth a few times—they could never work on it together in the same room. For the dialogue, Pressburger knew what he wanted the characters to say but Powell would often supply some of the actual words.

They both acted as producers, perhaps Pressburger slightly more than Powell, since he could soothe the feathers ruffled by Powell's forthright manner. They became their own producers mainly to stop anyone else from interfering, since they had a considerable degree of freedom, especially under Rank, to make just about any film they wanted.

The direction was nearly all done by Powell, but even so The Archers generally worked as a team, with the cast and crew often making suggestions. Pressburger was always on hand, usually on the studio floor, to make sure that these late changes fit seamlessly into the story.

Once the filming was finished, Powell usually went off for a walk in the hills of Scotland to clear his head, but Pressburger was often closely involved in the editing, especially in the way the music was used. Pressburger was a musician himself and had played the violin in an orchestra in Hungary.

When the film was finally ready and Powell was back from the Highlands, he was usually "the front man" in any promotional work, such as interviews for the trade papers or fan magazines.

Because collaborative efforts such as Powell and Pressburger's were, and continue to be, unusual in the film industry, and because of the influence of the auteur theory, which elevates the director as a film's primary creator, Pressburger has sometimes been dismissed as "Michael Powell's scriptwriter", but Powell himself was the first to say, in many interviews, that he couldn't have done most of what he did without Pressburger.

Post-war success and decline
Black Narcissus (1947)
The Red Shoes (1948)
The Small Back Room (1949)
The Elusive Pimpernel (1950)
Gone to Earth (1950). A substantially re-edited version was released in the US as The Wild Heart (1952) by co-producer David O. Selznick, after a court battle with Powell and Pressburger. The film was fully restored by the British Film Archive in 1985.
The Tales of Hoffmann (1951)

End of the partnership
In the early 1950s Powell and Pressburger began to produce fewer films, with notably less success. The Archers' productions officially came to an end in 1957, and the pair separated to pursue their individual careers. The separation was amicable, and they remained devoted friends for the rest of their lives.

Oh... Rosalinda!! (1955)
The Battle of the River Plate (1956)
Ill Met by Moonlight (1957)

Later collaboration
The pair reunited for two films:

They're a Weird Mob (1966)
The Boy Who Turned Yellow (1972)

Regular cast and crew
Powell and Pressburger re-used actors and crew members in a number of films. Actors who were part of The Archers' "stock company" include:

 Pamela Brown
 Kathleen Byron
 Robert Coote
 Finlay Currie
 Cyril Cusack
 Esmond Knight
 David Farrar
 Marius Goring
 Robert Helpmann
 Wendy Hiller
 Valerie Hobson
 Deborah Kerr
 John Laurie
 Roger Livesey
 Raymond Massey
 Léonide Massine
 Laurence Olivier
 Eric Portman
 Sir Ralph Richardson
 Moira Shearer 
 Jean Simmons
 Conrad Veidt
 Anton Walbrook
 Googie Withers

Notable crew members include:

 Cinematographers: Erwin Hillier, Jack Cardiff and Christopher Challis.
 Production and costume designers Alfred Junge, Hein Heckroth and Ivor Beddoes.
 Composers and musicians Brian Easdale, Allan Gray, Sir Thomas Beecham and Miklós Rózsa.
 Editors David Lean and Reginald Mills. Lean edited two early films, and went on to become a well-known and influential director himself. Mills edited twelve films from 1946–1956, nearly to the end of the partnership.

Critical opinions

British film critics gave the films of Powell and Pressburger a mixed reaction at the time, acknowledging their creativity, but sometimes questioning their motivations and taste. For better or worse, The Archers were always out of step with mainstream British cinema.

From the 1970s onwards, British critical opinion began to revise this lukewarm assessment, with their first BFI retrospective in 1970 and another in 1978. They are now seen as playing a key part in the history of British film, and have become influential and iconic for many film-makers of later generations, such as Martin Scorsese, Francis Ford Coppola and George A. Romero, among others.

Filmography
The Spy in Black (1939)
Contraband (1940)
49th Parallel (1941)
One of Our Aircraft Is Missing (1942)
The Life and Death of Colonel Blimp (1943)
The Volunteer (1943)
A Canterbury Tale (1944)
I Know Where I'm Going! (1945)
A Matter of Life and Death (1946)
Black Narcissus (1947)
The Red Shoes (1948)
The Small Back Room (1949)
The Elusive Pimpernel (1950)
Gone to Earth (1950)
The Tales of Hoffmann (1951)
Oh... Rosalinda!! (1955)
The Battle of the River Plate (1956)
Ill Met by Moonlight (1957)
They're a Weird Mob (1966)
The Boy Who Turned Yellow (1972)

Awards, nominations and honours
Four of their films are among the Top 50 British films of the 20th century according to the British Film Institute, with The Red Shoes placing in the top 10.

Powell and Pressburger, the people and their films have been the subject of many documentaries and books as well as doctoral research.

An English Heritage blue plaque to commemorate Powell and Pressburger was unveiled on 17 February 2014 by Martin Scorsese and Thelma Schoonmaker at Dorset House, Gloucester Place, London, where The Archers had their offices from 1942–47.

See also
Cinema of the United Kingdom

References
Notes

Bibliography

 Christie, Ian. Arrows of Desire: The Films of Michael Powell and Emeric Pressburger.  London: Waterstone, 1985. , later edition, 1994.  (pbk).
 Christie, Ian. Powell, Pressburger and Others.  London: British Film Institute, 1978. .
 Christie, Ian and Andrew Moor, eds. The Cinema of Michael Powell: International Perspectives on an English Filmmaker. London: BFI, 2005. .
 Darakhvelidze, George. Landscapes of Dreams: The Cinema of Michael Powell and Emeric Pressburger (Part 1-7) (in Russian). Vinnitsa, Ukraine: Globe Press, 2008–2019. .
 Esteve, Llorenç. Michael Powell y Emeric Pressburger (in Spanish).  Madrid: Catedra, 2002.  .
 Howard, James. Michael Powell. London: BT Batsford Ltd, 1996. .
 Lazar, David, ed. Michael Powell: Interviews. Jackson, Mississippi: University Press of Mississippi, 2003. .
 Macdonald, Kevin. Emeric Pressburger: The Life and Death of a Screenwriter. London: Faber & Faber, 1994. 
 Moor, Andrew. Powell and Pressburger: A Cinema of Magic Spaces. London: I.B. Tauris, 2005. .
 Powell, Michael. A Life in Movies (autobiography). London: Heinemann, 1986. , later edition, 1993.  (pbk).
 Powell, Michael. Million Dollar Movie (The second volume of his autobiography). London: Heinemann, 1992. , later edition, 2000.  (pbk).
 Thiéry, Natacha. Photogénie du désir: Michael Powell et Emeric Pressburger 1945–1950 (in French). Rennes, France: Presse Universitaires de Rennes, 2009. .

External links
 The Archers at the British Film Institute
 The Archers at BFI's screenonline.org.uk
 The Archers productions from the Internet Movie Database
 
 
 Michael Powell at TCM Movie Database
 Emeric Pressburger at TCM Movie Database
 Powell and Pressburger at Senses of Cinema
 The Powell and Pressburger Pages
 The Action/Suspense Movies of Powell & Pressburger

Filmmaking duos
Film production companies of the United Kingdom
Films by Powell and Pressburger
British male screenwriters
British film producers
British film directors